Chavara state assembly constituency is a legislative assembly constituency in Kollam district of Kerala, India. It is one among the 11 assembly constituencies in Kollam district.

Structure
As per the recent changes on assembly constituency delimitations, the Chavara assembly constituency consists of the 7 wards from Kollam Municipal Corporation (Maruthadi, Sakthikulangara, Meenathuchery, Kavanad, Vallikeezhu, Alattukavu, Kannimel) and 5 neighbouring panchayaths including Chavara, Neendakara, Panmana, Chavara Thekkumbhagom and Thevalakkara.

Electoral history

Travancore-Cochin Legislative Assembly Elections

Members of Legislative Assembly 
The following list contains all members of Kerala legislative Assembly who have represented the constituency:

Key

 KRSP(B) is a splinter group of RSP.
 CMP(A) later merged with CPI(M).

Election results 
Percentage change (±%) denotes the change in the number of votes from the immediate previous election.

Niyamasabha Election 2016 
There were 1,75,916 registered voters in the constituency for the 2016 Kerala Niyamasabha Election.

Niyamasabha Election 2011 
There were 1,59,655 registered voters in the constituency for the 2016 Kerala Niyamasabha Election.

Notes

References

Assembly constituencies of Kerala
Government of Kollam
Politics of Kollam district
Assembly constituencies in Kollam district
1977 establishments in Kerala
Constituencies established in 1977